Lucas Barbosa (born July 4, 1994) is a Brazilian aerobic gymnast who finished third in the men's individual event at the 2021 Aerobic Gymnastics World Championships held in Baku, Azerbaijan.

References

External links
 Lucas Barbosa at the International Gymnastics Federation

1994 births
Living people
Brazilian aerobic gymnasts
Male aerobic gymnasts
Medalists at the Aerobic Gymnastics World Championships
Sportspeople from Belo Horizonte
20th-century Brazilian people
21st-century Brazilian people